Josie Totah (born August 5, 2001), formerly known as J. J. Totah, is an American actress. She is known for her recurring role on the Disney Channel series Jessie and supporting role on the 2013 ABC comedy series Back in the Game. Totah received critical praise for her role in the 2016 film Other People. In 2018, she starred in the short-lived NBC comedy series Champions.
She starred as Lexi in the 2020 revival of Saved by the Bell.

Totah began her career playing male roles but publicly came out as a trans woman in August 2018, changing her first name to Josie.

Early life
Totah was born in Sacramento, California, the third child of Suheil and Christine Totah. She has one sister and one brother, and is of Palestinian and Lebanese ancestry.

Career
Totah began her acting career in 2012 when she was cast as the "Lil' Dictator" in the first production for AwesomenessTV. Beginning in 2013, she began appearing as Stuart Wooten, a boy with a crush on series regular Zuri Ross, in the Disney Channel Original Series Jessie. Totah has guest starred on the TV shows, New Girl, 2 Broke Girls, and Liv and Maddie.

Also in 2013, Totah was cast in a supporting role in the ABC comedy Back in the Game. In 2015, she was cast in 4 episodes of the sixth season Glee as the youngest member ever of the New Directions.

In 2016, Totah appeared in the film Other People, and received critical praise for her role with Variety, making her one of its Sundance Breakout Stars of the year. In October 2016, Deadline Hollywood reported that Totah would star in a new comedy for NBC that she helped develop where Totah was set to produce alongside executive producers Adam and Naomi Scott.  In 2017, she appeared in the Netflix detective comedy Handsome: A Netflix Mystery Movie and the Marvel Studios film Spider-Man: Homecoming.

In January 2017, Totah joined Adam Devine in the Disney feature film Magic Camp. In February 2017 Totah was cast as Michael Patel, the son of Mindy Kaling's character, Priya Patel, in the new NBC comedy Champions, which was picked up to series in May 2017, and aired from March 8 to May 25, 2018, before being canceled. Totah was cast in a Saved by the Bell reboot for NBC's streaming service Peacock, where she played the character of Lexi, a socially powerful cheerleader.<ref name="Saved THR">{{Cite web|url=https://www.hollywoodreporter.com/live-feed/peacocks-saved-by-bell-sequel-finds-lead-josie-totah-1266269|title=Peacock's Saved by the Bell''' Sequel Finds Its Lead in Josie Totah |website=The Hollywood Reporter|date=January 6, 2020 |language=en|access-date=2020-01-07}}</ref>

In August 2022, she started a podcast titled Dare We Say with Yasmine Hamady and Saved by the Bell co-star Alycia Pascual-Peña.

Personal life
On August 20, 2018, Totah wrote an article published in Time magazine'' in which she came out as a transgender woman.

Totah attended Chapman University, graduating in 2022. She was a member of a sorority.

Filmography

References

External links

2001 births
Living people
21st-century American comedians
American stand-up comedians
American comedians of Arab descent
Actresses from Sacramento, California
American people of Lebanese descent
American people of Palestinian descent
American child actresses
LGBT people from California
American LGBT actors
Transgender actresses
American film actresses
American television actresses
21st-century American actresses
Comedians from California